Eye of the Widow is a 1991 French-American action film directed by Andrew V. McLaglen, the last of his career. It was released in France on October 17, 1991, and in the Philippines on October 14, 1992.

Plot 
The movie starts with the dangerous and cold-blooded arms dealer Kharoun, who is getting rid of his competitors and adversaries with his army of highly trained killers. The next one on his list is Prince Malko, which location he already has tracked down and planned to attack. But Malko survives the bombing of his castle and flees to the CIA headquarters in New York where he learns that Kharoun owns the serum for a biological mass destruction weapon. After a second murder attempt on Malko, he decides to face Kharoun and goes in for a counterattack.

Production
It was written by Joshua Sauli as an adaptation of two Gérard de Villiers' novels of his SAS series about the Austrian secret agent Malko Linge. It stars Richard Young as Malko Linge along with Mel Ferrer, Ben Cross, Paul L. Smith, F. Murray Abraham and Susannah Hoffman.

This was the final film for McLaglen, director of many well-known Westerns starring the likes of John Wayne, James Stewart and Dean Martin.

Cast

Main cast

F. Murray Abraham as Kharoun
Ben Cross as Nassiri
Annabel Schofield as Sharnilar Khasani
Mel Ferrer as Frankenheimer the CIA chief
Richard Young as Prince Malko Linge
Paul L. Smith as Elko Krisantem
Terence Ford as Milton Brabeck
Rick Hill as Chris Jones
Patrick Macnee as Andrew Marcus
Felicity Dean as Victoria
Ashley Richardson as Ingrid
Aharon Ipalé as Soltaneh
Susannah Hoffmann as Countess Alexandra (Credited as Susanna Hofmann)
Sacha Briquet as Cardinal

Supporting cast

Mike Marshall as Klaus
Benjamin Feitelson as Kashani
Nabila Khashoggi as Vanya
Elvira Neustaedtl as Anna
Erwin Strahl as Frans
Norbert Blecha as Werner
Christina Klingler as Countess
Julien Maurel as Ahmad
François Guétary as Asio
Eric Dabbous as Terrorist
Nieves Romero as Leila
David Jalil as Mahmud
Lou Palumbo as Mark
William S. Taylor as FBI Agent Cook (scenes deleted)
Ken Kirzinger as Gabrisky
Jeffrey Nordling as FBI Agent
Terry David Mulligan as Mac Carthy
Fred Henderson as Agent Fred
José Gonzales as Drunken Man
Ray Corbett as Cyrus
Eddie Stacey as Walter
Carla Jewel as Suzy
Guy Di Rigo as Skipper
Arthur Denberg as Steward
George Overend as Ormouz Captain
Alice Hantelle as Twin
Anaïs Hantelle as Twin
Gregory Dark as Messenger
Allan Wenger as Parkinson
Charles Millot as Carlos
Pepe Luis Martin as Matador
Mohamed Khashoggi as Spanish Van Driver
Raymond Gellini as Kharoun's Cook

Cameo/uncredited cast
Alexander Blaise as Club Patron
Dion J. Mitchell as Police Officer #1

Release
Eye of the Widow was released in France on October 17, 1991. In the Philippines, the film was released with the same name on October 14, 1992.

References

External links

1991 films
1990s action films
American spy thriller films
1990s English-language films
English-language French films
Films directed by Andrew McLaglen
Films set in France
Films set in Spain
French spy thriller films
1990s American films
1990s French films